Oleksandr Holokolosov is a Ukrainian name, may refer to:
Oleksandr Holokolosov (football manager)
Oleksandr Holokolosov (footballer born 1976)